The India national under-23 football team represents India in international under-23 football and is controlled by the All India Football Federation (AIFF). A member of the Asian Football Confederation (AFC), the team is eligible to compete in the Summer Olympic Games, the AFC U-23 Asian Cup, and the Asian Games, subject to qualification.

Since only allowing under-23 sides to compete in the Olympic Games in 1992, India have never qualified for the summer games. The under-23 side have also never participated in the AFC U-23 Asian Cup while at best only making it to the round of 16 in the Asian Games.

History

Asian Games

2002 Busan Games
The under-23 side participated in their first ever tournament during the 2002 Asian Games in Busan, South Korea. They were put into a group with China, Turkmenistan, and Bangladesh. Their first match was against Bangladesh. India won 3–0 through a brace from future senior captain Baichung Bhutia and a strike from Renedy Singh. India played their second match two days later against Turkmenistan. They won 3–1. Bhutia again scored a brace while Abhishek Yadav scored the third goal as India ran out 3–1 winners. Unfortunately, in their final match against China, India could not find the net as they fell 2–0 and thus were knocked-out of the Asian Games.

2006 Doha Games
During the 2006 Asian Games India were placed in a group with Iran, Hong Kong, and Maldives. In their first match against Hong Kong, India drew 1–1 with Pappachen Pradeep scoring the lone Indian goal. In their second match, India faced off against Maldives and won 2–1. Irungbam Surkumar Singh and Subhas Sumbhu Chakrobarty were the scorers for India that night. Finally, in their last match against Iran, India once again lost 2–0 and thus were once again knocked-out of the Asian Games.

2010 Guangzhou Games
During the 2010 Asian Games in Guangzhou, China, India were placed in a group with Qatar, Kuwait Athletes, and Singapore. India lost their first match against the Kuwait Athletes 2–0 and then lost their second match against Qatar 2–1 with the lone India goal coming from Dharmaraj Ravanan. India went on to win their final match of the group stage against Singapore 4–1. Four players scored each goal, Jewel Raja, Balwant Singh, Jibon Singh, and Manish Maithani. The victory managed to help India finish in third-place which then helped India become the best third-place team out of all the other third-placed teams and thus qualified them for the Round of 16.

In the Round of 16, India took on powerhouse Japan at the Huangpu Sports Center. India went on to lose the match 5–0 with Kensuke Nagai scoring a brace and Ryohei Yamazaki, Kazuya Yamamura, and Kota Mizunuma scoring a goal each.

2014 Incheon Games
For the 2014 Asian Games in Incheon, South Korea, India were placed in Group G with Jordan and the United Arab Emirates. In their first match against the United Arab Emirates, India went down 5–0. Seven days later, India were defeated by Jordan 2–0 to end their Asian Games participation.

Other tournaments

2009 SAFF Championship
Before the 2009 SAFF Championship in Bangladesh, it was announced that India would send the under-23 side to the tournament. India were placed in Group A with Afghanistan, Maldives, and Nepal. In their first match against Afghanistan, India won 1–0 through Jeje Lalpekhlua. In their next match against Nepal, a Sushil Kumar Singh goal was the difference as India won again 1–0. Despite losing the last match of the group stage to Maldives 2–0 India were still through to the semi-finals.

India defeated Bangladesh in the semi-finals 1–0 through Sushil Kumar Singh. Finally, in the final against Maldives, India won through penalties 3–1 after finishing extra-time with the score at 0–0 to win the championship.

Results and fixtures
For past match results of the national team, see the team's results page.
The following is a list of match results in the last 12 months, as well as any future matches that have been scheduled.
 Legend

2021

2023

Coaching staff
The current coaching staff of the team are:

Players

Current squad
The following 23 players were called up for 2022 AFC U-23 Asian Cup qualification matches which are scheduled to be played between 24 and 30 October 2021. Players born on or after 1 January 1999 are eligible to compete in the tournament.

Caps and goals are updated as of 30 October 2021.

Past squads

Asian Games
2002 Asian Games
2006 Asian Games
2010 Asian Games
2014 Asian Games

Competitive record

Summer Olympics

From 1908 to 1988, football at the Olympics was played by senior national teams. and between these years India national football team competed at all Games from 1948 to 1960. From 1992, FIFA allowed only U-23 national teams to play the tournament at the Olympics. Though U-23 players were allowed, the qualifying matches of 1992 Olympics to 2012 Olympics were played by the Senior national team of India but failed to qualify to the Olympics finals from 1992 to 2012. AFC started AFC U-23 Championship from 2013 which is now acted as the qualifying tournament for the Olympics for the Asian countries, where top three teams are allowed entry to Olympic finals. India is yet to qualify for the AFC U-23 Championship and thus also at Olympics since then.

AFC U-23 Asian Cup
AFC U-23 Asian Cup was initially set to be held as AFC U-22 Championships in 2013 and its qualification matches in 2012, but the finals tournament was postponed to be played in January 2014. Till now, three championships held, in 2014, 2016, 2018 and 2020. However, India failed to qualify to any of the championships.

Asian Games

South Asian Games

Honours
LG Cup
Winners (1): 2002

See also

Football in India
India national football team
India women's national football team
India national under-20 football team
India national under-17 football team

References

External links
All India Football Federation

 
Asian national under-23 association football teams
Football
Football
Youth football in India